Charles Longstreet Weltner (December 17, 1927 – August 31, 1992) was an American jurist and politician from the U.S. state of Georgia.

Early years and education
Weltner was born in Atlanta, Georgia. In 1948, he received a bachelor's degree from Oglethorpe University in suburban DeKalb County, Georgia. In 1950, he received a law degree from Columbia Law School in New York City. After serving two years in the United States Army, Weltner practiced law in Atlanta and worked to defeat Georgia's county-unit system and preserve the public school system after state leaders threatened to close the schools rather than integrate.

Political career
In 1962, Weltner was elected to represent Georgia's 5th congressional district in the House of Representatives as a Democrat.

Weltner was one of only two Southern members of Congress to condemn the 16th Street Baptist Church bombing in Birmingham, Ala., in 1963 by white supremacists that killed four girls and injured between 14 and 22 other people. He was the only member of the state's congressional delegation (and the only Democrat from the Deep South) to vote for the Civil Rights Act of 1964, commenting that "We must not remain forever bound to another lost cause." Weltner voted in favor of the Voting Rights Act of 1965.

He also supported quick implementation of the United States Supreme Court decision to outlaw racial segregation in public schools, the 1954 decision Brown v. Board of Education.

In 1966, Weltner refused to run for re-election when the state Democratic Party demanded that he sign a loyalty oath that would have required him to support Lester Maddox, an ardent segregationist who was running for governor against a Republican U.S. representative, Howard Callaway. In a speech, Weltner said, "I love the Congress, but I will give up my office before I give up my principles." No other had taken the loyalty oath so literally. Weltner described Maddox as "the very symbol of violence and repression". Nevertheless, Maddox was chosen governor by the state legislature as a result of a general election impasse with Callaway and former Governor Ellis Arnall, who received critical votes as a write-in candidate. Maddox ridiculed Weltner for abandoning the House race: "Anyone who would give up his seat in Congress is sick".
Conversely, both U.S. Senator Robert F. Kennedy and civil rights movement leader Martin Luther King Jr., hailed Weltner's courage for rejecting Maddox. The Macon Telegraph decreed Weltner "a public servant greatly to be admired". The Savannah Morning News termed Weltner "a man of principle" but repudiated his "foolhardy liberalism".

Callaway expressed "amusement" over the "foolish" loyalty oath and questioned whether Weltner withdrew from the race because he feared the Republican Fletcher Thompson, a state senator from Atlanta, would unseat him. Later Callaway referred to his House colleague Weltner as "courageous", but Weltner dismissed Southern Republicans at that time as "Dixiecrats in button-down shirts". Weltner said Callaway viewed Georgia as "a giant company store".

Weltner tried to regain his seat in 1968 on the Humphrey-Muskie ticket but lost to his Republican successor, Fletcher Thompson. In 1973, Weltner ran for mayor of Atlanta but finished third behind Jewish incumbent Sam Massell and the eventual winner, Vice Mayor Maynard Jackson, an African American.

Judicial career
After leaving politics, Weltner continued his legal career, first as a judge in the Fulton County Superior Court from 1976 to 1981 and then serving as an associate justice of the Supreme Court of Georgia from 1981 to 1992. In June 1992, he was elected as chief justice of that body by his fellow justices, and he served in that role until his death in Atlanta on August 31, 1992, of esophageal cancer that had been diagnosed two years earlier.

Awards 
In 1991, Weltner became the second person to be honored with the John F. Kennedy Profile in Courage Award, the first having been former U.S. Representative Carl Elliott of Alabama, another civil rights advocate. And honoris causa inductee of Omicron Delta Kappa in 1969, he was honored with Omicron Delta Kappa's highest honor, the Laurel Crowned Circle Award, for excellence in leadership in 1992.

See also
 List of members of the House Un-American Activities Committee

References

External links
Speech by Charles Weltner on March 22, 1968, about the Southerner at the crossroads. Audio from The University of Alabama's Emphasis Symposium on Contemporary Issues

1927 births
1992 deaths
Georgia (U.S. state) lawyers
Georgia (U.S. state) state court judges
Politicians from Atlanta
Military personnel from Georgia (U.S. state)
United States Army officers
Oglethorpe University alumni
Columbia Law School alumni
Chief Justices of the Supreme Court of Georgia (U.S. state)
Democratic Party members of the United States House of Representatives from Georgia (U.S. state)
20th-century American lawyers
20th-century American politicians
20th-century American judges
Justices of the Supreme Court of Georgia (U.S. state)
Superior court judges in the United States